The Order of Honour is a state order of the Russian Federation established by Presidential Decree No. 442 of March 2, 1994 to recognise high achievements in government, economic, scientific, sociocultural, public, sport and charitable activities.  Its statute was amended by decree No. 19 of January 6, 1999 and more lately by decree No. 1099 of January 7, 2010  which defined its present status.

The award is the successor of the Soviet Order of the Badge of Honour (renamed Order of Honour in 1988).

Award statute
The Order of Honour is awarded to citizens of the Russian Federation:
 For high achievements in production and economic indicators in industry, construction, agriculture, communications, energy and transport, coupled with the predominant use of innovative technologies in the production process
 For a significant increase in the level of socio-economic development of the Russian Federation; for achievements in modernizing the Russian health care system, aimed at significantly improving the quality of the provision of medical services, as well as the development and widespread practical applications of modern and innovative methods of diagnosing and treating diseases
 For achievements in scientific research resulting in significant Russian scientific and technological advantage in various fields of science, increased domestic production of competitive high-tech products
 For services to improve the Russian education system aimed at dramatically improving the quality of the education provided, the system of training specialists for the Russian economy and increasing international prestige of Russian educational institutions
 For significant contribution to the preservation, promotion and development of Russian culture, art, history and the Russian language, associated with increased levels of cultural and humanitarian development of civil and patriotic education of the younger generation
 For very fruitful public, charitable and community activities
 For merit in the promotion, and support of youth sports, as well as professional sport, considerably increasing the level of physical activity and making Russia a World leader in individual sports

The Order may also be conferred on foreign citizens who have performed outstanding service to improve bilateral relations with Russia.

The Order of Honour is worn on the left side of the chest and when in the presence of other medals and orders of the Russian Federation, is situated immediately after the Order "For Naval Merit".

Award description

The Order is struck from silver and covered with enamels, it is shaped as a 42 mm in diameter octagonal cross enamelled in blue on its obverse except for a 2 mm wide band along its entire outer edge which remains bare silver.  The obverse bears a white enamelled central medallion bordered by a silver laurel wreath, the medallion bears the silver state symbol of the Russian Federation.  On the otherwise plain reverse, two rivets and the award serial number at the bottom.

The Order of Honour is suspended by a ring through the badge's suspension loop to a standard Russian pentagonal mount covered by a 24 mm wide overlapping blue silk moiré ribbon with a 2.5 mm wide white stripe situated 5 mm from the ribbon's right edge.

Notable recipients (partial list)
The individuals below are recipients of the Order of Honour".

Mikhail Gorbachev, last General Secretary of the Communist Party of the Soviet Union, first and only elected President of the USSR
Pavel Romanovich Popovich, cosmonaut
Viacheslav "Slava" Alexandrovich Fetisov, former Minister of Sport of Russia
Vladimir Volfovich Zhirinovsky, politician, Vice-Chairman of the State Duma
Moshe Kantor, peace activist
Tikhon Nikolayevich Khrennikov, composer, pianist and political activist
Muslim Mahammad oglu Magomayev, (musician) singer
Mikhail Yefimovich Fradkov, former Prime Minister of Russia
Sergey Viktorovich Lavrov, diplomat, Russia's ambassador to the United Nations (1994–2004), Russia's Foreign Minister (2004–present)
Sergei Konstantinovich Krikalev, Hero of the Soviet Union, Hero of the Russian Federation, and cosmonaut
Yuli Mikhailovich Vorontsov, diplomat, former Russian Ambassador to the United States
Dmitry Timofeyevich Yazov, Marshal of the Soviet Union
Yury Mikhaylovich Luzhkov, former Mayor of Moscow
Sergey Tetyukhin, volleyball player
Sergey Kuzhugetovich Shoygu, former Minister of Emergency Situations, Minister of Defense (2012–present)
Viktor Petrovich Savinykh, cosmonaut
Sherig-ool Dizizhikovich Oorzhak, former leader of the Tuva
Juan Antonio Samaranch, seventh President of the International Olympic Committee
Vitaly Gennadyevich Savelyev, Director General and former CEO of Aeroflot
Anatoly Yuryevich Ravikovich, actor
Aleksandr Yur'evich Rumyantsev, minister, scientist, academic, and ambassador
Andrey Tokarev, Paralympic medalist
Roman Abramovich, owner of Chelsea F.C
Valery Leontiev, pop singer
Vladimir Putin, former Director of the FSB (Holding the rank of Colonel in the KGB), former Prime Minister of Russia, and the 2nd and the 4th (current) President of Russia
Christophe de Margerie (posthumously), CEO and Chairman of Total S.A.
Alexander Zaldostanov, leader of the Night Wolves
Evgeny Plushenko, figure skater, Olympic Champion
Aliya Mustafina, artistic gymnast, two time Olympic Champion
Arnold Meri, honorary chairman of the Estonian Anti-Fascist Committee (posthumously)
Philipp Kirkorov, pop singer
Alexander Ovechkin, NHL ice hockey left winger, seven time Kharlamov Trophy winner
Andrei Vasilevskiy, NHL ice hockey goaltender, Vezina Trophy winner, two-time Stanley Cup winner and Conn Smythe Trophy winner
Valery Khalilov, Russian military conductor
Kassym-Jomart Tokayev, 2nd President of Kazakhstan
Nikolai Kardashev Astrophysicist 
Oleg Leonidovich Kuznetsov, current president of the Russian Academy of Natural Sciences
Mikhail Golovatov, intelligence officer

See also
Awards and decorations of the Russian Federation
Order of the Badge of Honour (USSR)
Order of Honour (Belarus)
Order of Kurmet (Kazakhstan)

References

External links
The Commission on State Awards under the President of the Russian Federation
The Russian Gazette
Site of the President of the Russian Federation

Orders, decorations, and medals of Russia
Civil awards and decorations of Russia
Russian awards
Awards established in 1994
1994 establishments in Russia